Blood Oath may refer to:

 "Blood Oath" (Star Trek: Deep Space Nine), Star Trek: Deep Space 9 episode
 Blood Oath, 1982 novel by David Morrell
 Blood Oath (Farnsworth novel), 2010 novel by Christopher Farnsworth
 Blood Oath (film), 1990 Australian film a.k.a. Prisoners of the Sun
 Blood Oath, the name of a fictional film from the 2002 video game Stuntman
 Blood Oath (album), is the sixth studio album by death metal band Suffocation
 Blood brothers partaking in a "blood oath" ceremony
 Blood oath (Hungarians), a pact between the leaders of the seven Hungarian tribes in the 9th century; traditionally held to be the nation's first constitution
 Penalty (Mormonism), an oath formerly made in Mormon temples, referred to by critics as a "blood oath"

See also
 Jos LeDuc, Canadian professional wrestler best known for a 1978 live television interview where he cut his own arm with an axe in a storyline blood oath